Proverbs 20 is the twentieth chapter of the Book of Proverbs in the Hebrew Bible or the Old Testament of the Christian Bible. The book is a compilation of several wisdom literature collections, with the heading in 1:1 may be intended to regard Solomon as the traditional author of the whole book, but the dates of the individual collections are difficult to determine, and the book probably obtained its final shape in the post-exilic period. This chapter is a part of the second collection of the book.

Text
The original text is written in Hebrew language. This chapter is divided into 30 verses.

Textual witnesses
Some early manuscripts containing the text of this chapter in Hebrew are of the Masoretic Text, which includes the Aleppo Codex (10th century), and Codex Leningradensis (1008).

There is also a translation into Koine Greek known as the Septuagint, made in the last few centuries BC. Extant ancient manuscripts of the Septuagint version include Codex Vaticanus (B; B; 4th century), Codex Sinaiticus (S; BHK: S; 4th century), and Codex Alexandrinus (A; A; 5th century).

Parashot
The parashah sections listed here are based on the Aleppo Codex. {P}: open parashah.
 {P} 19:10–29; 20:1–30; 21:1–30 {P} 21:31; 22:1–29 {P}

Analysis
This chapter belongs to a section regarded as the second collection in the book of Proverbs (comprising Proverbs 10:1–22:16), also called "The First 'Solomonic' Collection" (the second one in Proverbs 25:1–29:27). The collection contains 375 sayings, each of which consists of two parallel phrases, except for Proverbs 19:7 which consists of three parts.

Verse 1
’’Wine is a mocker, strong drink is raging:and whosoever is deceived thereby is not wise.’’
"Wine": based on the locality likely refers to grape wine and barley beer (cf. Leviticus 10:9; Deuteronomy 14:26; Isaiah 28:7).
"Raging": can also be rendered as "brawler" (cf. Proverbs 23:29-35).
The last phrase may mean that "drinking to excess is not wise" or that "drinking to excess makes a person act unwisely", so the proverb does not prohibit the use of wine or beer, as strong drink was typically used at festivals and celebrations, but in the covenant community intoxication was considered out of bounds (cf. Proverbs 23:20–21, 29–35; 31:4–7).

Verse 14
"It is bad, it is bad," says the buyer;
but when he has gone his way, then he boasts. 
This verse provides a picture of a negotiation procedure in the business world. When bargaining, a buyer would complain that he is being offered 'inferior goods' so he can get a reduction in the price, and thereafter he brags about what a good deal he got.

Verse 25
It is a snare to the man who dedicates rashly that which is holy,
and after the vows to make inquiry.
"Snare": because it could lead into financial difficulties (cf. Leviticus 27 talking about foolish or rash vows).
This verse is about the folly of rash speaking (cf. ) especially in relation to a vow, because failure to fulfil a vow was a serious matter (cf.), whereas fulfilling a rash vow could be costly (cf. Jephthah and his daughter in Judges 11:29–40).

See also

Related Bible parts: Psalm 21, Proverbs 9, Proverbs 18, Proverbs 22, Proverbs 23

References

Sources

External links
 Jewish translations:
 Mishlei - Proverbs - Chapter 20 (Judaica Press) translation [with Rashi's commentary] at Chabad.org
 Christian translations:
 Online Bible at GospelHall.org (ESV, KJV, Darby, American Standard Version, Bible in Basic English)
 Book of Proverbs Chapter 20 King James Version
  Various versions

20